Viktor Platonovich Nekrasov (17 June 1911, Kyiv – 3 September 1987, Paris) was a Russian writer, journalist and editor.

Biography
Nekrasov was born in Kyiv and graduated with a degree in architecture in 1936. During World War II, he served in the Red Army (1941–1944), reaching the rank of captain, and fought in the Battle of Stalingrad. As for many writers of his generation, the war was a formative experience for Nekrasov: in addition to combat, the close comradeship he observed there among soldiers of different backgrounds and classes changed his understanding of Soviet society. As Michael Falchikov writes, "Nekrasov 'discovered' the peasantry by fighting alongside them." After the war he became a journalist and based his first book Front-line Stalingrad (V okopakh Stalingrada, literal translation In the trenches of Stalingrad, 1946) on his experiences there. The novel was awarded the USSR State Prize for literature in 1947.

After Joseph Stalin's death in 1953, Nekrasov took advantage of the first wave of destalinization to publish In the Home Town (1954), a novel which marked a departure from the Stalin-era socialist realism in Soviet literature. His later works, especially his novel Kira Georgievna (1961), are markedly anti-Stalinist. In 1959 he was the first Soviet writer to openly call for a monument to be built at Baby Yar. A travelogue of his experiences in Italy in 1957 and the United States in 1960, Both Sides of the Ocean, which was unusually open for its time, was published in 1962 and denounced by Nikita Khrushchev in 1963.

After Khruschev's ouster in October 1964, Nekrasov joined other Soviet intellectuals in protesting what he saw as the new government's gradual restoration of Stalinism. He signed numerous open letters protesting government policies in 1966-1973 and was expelled from the Communist Party of the Soviet Union in 1973. In 1974 he emigrated to France, where he became an associate editor of the emigre magazine Kontinent. While in exile, he wrote an  autobiography, Newspaper of a Peculiar One (1976), and a novel, Those of the Front (1978). In 1979, after he had made some ironic marks on Brezhnev's trilogy, Nekrasov's Soviet citizenship was revoked.  He died in Paris and was buried in Sainte-Geneviève-des-Bois Russian Cemetery, in the southern suburbs of Paris.

Works in English translation
Kira Georgievna. Tr. Walter N. Vickery, New York, Pantheon Books [1962], 183p.
Front-line Stalingrad. Tr. David Floyd, London, Harvill Press, [1962], 320 p.
The Perch. Tr. Vic Shneerson, in The Third Flare: Three War Stories, Moscow, Foreign Languages Pub. House, [1963], 229p.
Both Sides of the Ocean; a Russian Writer's Travels in Italy and the United States, New York, Holt, Rinehart and Winston, [1964], xv, 191p.
 Postscripts, Tr. Michael G. Falchikov; Quartet Books/Namara Group, London, [1991], 201p.

Further reading

References

Sources 
"Nekrasov, Viktor" in Encyclopedia of Ukraine, Vol. 3, Toronto, University of Toronto Press, 1993.

External links

 A comprehensive multimedia site, in Russian, offering biographical information, texts of Nekrasov's works, audio of his Radio Liberty broadcasts, his artwork, photographs, and video, as well as information on his network of friends: Виктор Некрасов. Сайт памяти писателя.    
Viktor Nekrasov Biography

1911 births
1987 deaths
Writers from Kyiv
Ukrainian people of World War II
Soviet military personnel of World War II
Soviet short story writers
20th-century short story writers
Soviet novelists
Soviet male writers
20th-century Russian male writers
Soviet dissidents
Recipients of the USSR State Prize
Expelled members of the Communist Party of the Soviet Union
Burials at Sainte-Geneviève-des-Bois Russian Cemetery
Deaths from lung cancer in France
People denaturalized by the Soviet Union
Soviet emigrants to France
20th-century Russian journalists